Winterbrook Bridge, also known as Wallingford By-pass Bridge, was built in 1993 as part of a by-pass around Wallingford, Oxfordshire, relieving the single-lane Wallingford Bridge. It forms part of the A4130, connecting Winterbrook, at the north end of Cholsey, just south of Wallingford, on the west bank to Mongewell on the east bank. It crosses the Thames on the reach between Cleeve Lock and Benson Lock. The , three span bridge is built of steel plate girders with a reinforced concrete deck slab and glass fibre reinforced plastic cladding on the underside.

During the construction, the remains of a late Bronze Age settlement on a former eyot were investigated on the west bank of the Thames. The bridge was designed so as not to disturb the archaeological site.  Close to the east bank, near Mongewell, the construction work allowed examination of the South Oxfordshire Grim's Ditch, the long earthwork followed by the Ridgeway Path, and showed it to be late Iron Age/early Roman.

See also
 Crossings of the River Thames

Notes

References
Cromarty, A.M., Barclay, A. Lambrick, G and Robinson, M. (2005) Archaeology of the Wallingford Bypass, 1986-92: Late Bronze Age Ritual and Habitation on a Thames Eyot at Whitecross Farm, Wallingford, Oxford : Oxbow Books, 
McKenzie, M. (1997) The Corrosivity of the Environment Inside Oxfordshire County Council Bridge Enclosures, unpubl. Project Report PR/CE/67/97, TRL, Crowthorne, UK
Peshkam, V. and Banks, W.M. (1996) "Design, analysis and testing of Winterbrook Bridge composite enclosure", in: Saadatmanesh, H., Ehsani, E.R and Ehsani, M.R. (Eds), First International Conference on Composites in Infrastructure, University of  Arizona, Tucson, p. 929–943
Ryall, M.J. (2001) Bridge Management, Butterworth-Heinemann, p. 294

External links

 Wallingford History Gateway

Bridges in Oxfordshire
Bridges across the River Thames
Bridges completed in 1993
Wallingford, Oxfordshire
1993 establishments in England